William Vance Wylie (July 15, 1928 — November 24, 1983) was a Canadian professional ice hockey centre who played in one National Hockey League game for the New York Rangers during the 1950–51 season, on January 20, 1951 against the Montreal Canadiens. The rest of his career, which lasted from 1948 to 1963, was spent in various minor leagues.  Wylie was also a member of the Galt Terriers senior amateur team that won the Allan Cup in 1961 and represented Canada at the 1962 World Championships.

Career statistics

Regular season and playoffs

International

See also
 List of players who played only one game in the NHL

References

External links
 

1928 births
1983 deaths
Brantford Lions players
Canadian expatriate ice hockey players in the United States
Canadian ice hockey centres
Cincinnati Mohawks (AHL) players
Galt Red Wings players
Galt Rockets players
Ice hockey people from Ontario
New York Rangers players
Ontario Hockey Association Senior A League (1890–1979) players
Quebec Aces (QSHL) players
St. Paul Saints (USHL) players
Vancouver Canucks (WHL) players
Sportspeople from Cambridge, Ontario